Nadezhda Ivanovna Merder (Svechina, Свечина, born 1839, — died 13 March 1906) was a Russian writer and playwright, better known under her pen name N. Severin (Н. Северин).

Born to a retired military man belonging to an old Russian rural gentry family, she debuted in Otechestvennye Zapiski with her 1877 short novel Out of Order (Не в порядке вещей) to be followed by numerous (in all, more than one hundred) novels, plays and novellas, which appeared originally in the magazines Delo, Zhivopisnoye Obozreniye, Vestnik Evropy, Istorichesky Vestnik, Niva. Of the several plays she wrote for theatre, the best known was Happiness in Marriage (Супружеское счастье, 1884).

Forgotten during the Soviet times, N. Severin's legacy was revived in 1990s after her Selected Works came out in 1997 via the Terra Publishers.

References 

Russian writers
1839 births
1906 deaths